The Nippon Music Foundation (NMF) is an organisation under the supervision of the Arts and Culture Promotion Division, Agency for Cultural Affairs, a special body of the Japanese Ministry of Education. Established 3 March 1972, its stated purpose is to develop international networks of music and foster public interest in music.

Instruments
NMF has in its endowment one of the largest collections of antique instruments made by luthier Antonio Stradivari (1644-1737), with an additional two by Giuseppe Guarneri (1698-1744).

Guarneri del Gesù
Violin
1736 Muntz
1740 Ysaÿe

Stradivarius
Cello
1696 Aylesford
1730 Feuermann; De Munck; Gardiner
1736 Paganini; Ladenburg

Viola
1731 Paganini; Mendelssohn

Violin
1680 Paganini; Desaint
1702 Lord Newlands 
1706 Dragonetti 
1708 Huggins 
1709 Engleman 
1710 Duc de Camposelice 
1714 Dolphin; Delfino 
1715 Joachim-Aranyi 
1716 Otto Booth 
1717 Sasserno 
1722 Jupiter; ex-Goding 
1725 Wilhelmj 
1727 Paganini; Conte Cozio di Salabue 
1736 Muntz

See also
 List of Stradivarius instruments

References

External links
Nippon Music Foundation website

Arts in Japan
Music organizations based in Japan
Foundations based in Japan
Japanese music